Harrison Tsui (born 1995) is a Hong Kong fashion photographer. He is best known for his backstage photography and street style photography work at Ready-to-wear Fashion Weeks.

Life and career
Tsui was born in Hong Kong. He studied graphic design at RMIT University, initially wanting to work in the advertising industry. He then began photographing his sister Faye Tsui, who is a fashion stylist, for her blog. He started going to Milan and Paris Fashion Week with her in 2015, and started photographing backstage and runway at fashion shows. In 2016, he started collaborating with Harper's Bazaar Singapore, photographing street style, fashion shows' backstage and runway for their website.

He has photographed backstage of Dior, Fendi, Prada, Versace, Kenzo, Yohji Yamamoto, Sacai and Max Mara's fashion show.

Apart from his fashion week work, Tsui also photographs fashion stories for different magazines.

His work has been published on American Vogue, InStyle U.S., Harper's Bazaar Singapore, Harper's Bazaar Hong Kong, Lifestyle Journal, Hong Kong Tatler, MilkX Hong Kong, Hashtag Legend.

References

External links
 
 Harrison Tsui's Instagram
 Harrison Tsui Archives - Harper's Bazaar Singapore

1995 births
Living people
Documentary photographers
Fashion photographers
Hong Kong people
RMIT University alumni